Thrixspermum trichoglottis is a monopodial orchid in the subfamily Epidendroideae. It is widespread across the eastern Himalayas, Yunnan, Indochina, the Andaman & Nicobar Islands, Malaysia and western Indonesia.

Description

Morphologies that have been observed in Pasoh Forest Reserve, Malaysia:
pseudobulb absent
monopodial
leaf equally bi-lobulate (young leaves somehow unequal)
leaves 15 mm x 65 mm, thin and fleshy
stem sheathed with internode, 1 cm
stem mildly branched
rooting throughout, rhizome heavily branched
inflorescence 1-2 flowers, with a long bract about 10 cm long, scale like
lateral sepal unevenly rhomboid, 4 x 7 mm
dorsal sepal elliptic, 2 x 6 mm
lip 7 x 6 mm with only one lobe
pubescent at both face of the lobe, with fleshy acute tip
yellow-orange spots on the outer surfaces near the lip tip
column small, 3 x 4 mm
color dimmer than petals and sepals
pollinia white

References

 Seidenfaden, G. and Wood, J.J. (1992). The Orchids of Peninsular Malaysia and Singapore. 

trichoglottis
Orchids of Asia
Plants described in 1890